IC 4651 is an open cluster of stars located about 2,900 light years distant in the constellation Ara. It was first catalogued by John Louis Emil Dreyer in his 1895 version of the Index Catalogue. This is an intermediate age cluster that is  billion years old. Compared to the Sun, the members of this cluster have a higher abundance of the chemical elements other than hydrogen and helium. The combined mass of the active stars in this cluster is about 630 times the mass of the Sun.

The currently known active stars in this cluster form only about 7% of the cluster's original mass. Of the remainder, about 35% of the mass consists of stars that have evolved into white dwarfs or other stellar remnants. The remainder of lost mass consists of stars that have migrated away from the main body of the cluster or have been lost completely.

References

External links 
 

Open clusters
4651
Ara (constellation)